The Proud and Damned, also known as The Proud and the Damned, Proud and Damned, and Proud, Damned and Dead, is a 1972 American-Colombian co-production Western film directed by Ferde Grofé Jr. that was shot in Colombia. Some sources quote the title as "The Proud and the Damned", which is not the original name. The actual title, "The Proud and Damned", is clearly displayed in the title text of the original film version in the opening of the movie. Some images erroneously use the title "The Proud and the Damned".

Plot 
In 1870, ex-Confederate mercenaries and American Civil War veterans Sgt. Will Hansen (Chuck Connors), Ike (Aron Kincaid), Hank (Henry Caps), Jeb (Smokey Robards), and Billy (Peter Ford) have just emigrated from their home state of Texas to Colombia in South America. After their arrival, they are ambushed by Colombian soldiers who force them to come meet General Martinez, the evil, cold-hearted dictator of their country. Martinez sends them to San Carlos, a town where rebel forces are preparing to start a civil war against Martinez's army. The Texans are instructed to live among the rebels, and report back to Martinez what they know within the next couple of days. Martinez warns them that they will be severely punished if they fail him.

The next day, while on their way to San Carlos, Will's gang runs into a gypsy family who are on their way to the same town. Will escorts them to the town and takes an interest in the daughter, Mila. They all ride into San Carlos, meet the governor, and rent a cabin outside of town. Will and Mila sneak out to spend the night together. Mila's father is angry when he finds out and cuts off her ear. Will shoots Mila's father.

Will and his men are detained over the killing and find themselves unable to report back to Martinez. Will and Mila are banished from the town because the townspeople are angry over Will killing Mila's father. Will and Mila are captured by Martinez, who hangs Will for disobeying his orders. Mila rides back to town to get Will's friends, who give him a funeral, and vow to avenge his murder. They join the rebels in a battle with Martinez's army and drive them back. They later ambush Martinez and the rest of his surviving soldiers in a canyon, joined by the rebel army's captain. They manage to kill Martinez, but all are gunned down by his soldiers except for Billy, who was unconscious after falling from his horse. The film ends with Billy riding off into the sunset.

Cast 
Chuck Connors as Will Hansen
Aron Kincaid as Ike
Cesar Romero as San Carlos' Mayor
José Greco as Ramon (the gypsy)
Smokey Roberds as Jeb
Henry Capps as Hank
Peter Ford as Billy
Andres Marquis as Gen. Alehandro Martinez
Conrad Parham as Capt. Juan Hernandez (the mayor's nephew)
Maria Grimm as Maria Vargas
Nana Lorca as Carmela (the dancer)
Anita Quinn as Mila (Hansen's gypsy girlfriend)
Álvaro Ruiz as Chico
Fernando González Pacheco as Lieutenant
Ignacio Gómez as Padre
Ernesto Uribe as Aide
Rey Vásquez as Innkeeper
Bernardo Herrera as Rollo

Production 
With a working title of The Proud, Damned and Dead, the production was filmed in 1969 in Villa de Leyva, Colombia. The film was unusual for a Ferde Grofe production in that it was his first feature film production outside of the Philippines (not including the American International Pictures pictures High School Hellcats and Hot Rod Gang from which he had his name removed from their credits), and secondly that there was no pre-sale - the production was a huge financial gamble for him. George Montgomery is credited as a co-producer by virtue of putting up $125,000 for Chuck Connors' pay. Grofe was concerned about what he had heard of Connors' on-set reputation and insisted that Connors' payment be placed in escrow and payment only made upon satisfactory completion of the film. In addition to the film's main stars, three smaller roles were filled by actors who would later appear in The Day of the Wolves: Andres Marquis, Smokey Roberds and Henry Capps.

Aftermath 
Grofe was unable to distribute the film through his usual industry channels, and it would take another three years to sell the film to the Texan entity that eventually distributed the film. George Montgomery threatened to sue Grofe for the return of his funds once it became clear that there was no immediate film sale.

See also
 List of American films of 1972

External links

1972 films
Colombian historical drama films
1972 Western (genre) films
American Western (genre) films
Films directed by Ferde Grofé Jr.
Films set in Colombia
Films set in 1870
Films about mercenaries
1970s historical adventure films
American historical adventure films
1970s English-language films
1970s American films